OSR may refer to:

Science and technology
 Operational sex ratio, of reproductively available males to females
 On-stack replacement, used by Jikes RVM, a Java virtual machine
 Optical solar reflector, a radiator material for space craft
 OEM Service Release, a Windows 95 distribution
 Open-source robotics

Transportation
 Leoš Janáček Airport Ostrava, in Czech Republic, IATA code OSR
 Ontario Southland Railway, in Canada
 Texas State Highway OSR, in the US

Other uses
 Old School Revival, a movement within tabletop role-playing games
 Owasippe Scout Reservation, a Boy Scout camp in Twin Lake, Michigan, U.S.
 Orchestre de la Suisse Romande, a Swiss symphony orchestra
 Operational Situation Reports, or Einsatzgruppen reports, dispatches of the Nazi death squads
 Ohio State Reformatory, a historic US prison
 Odessa Soviet Republic, a short-lived Soviet republic 
 Office of Strategic Research, a CIA intelligence analysis organization once headed by Richard Lehman
 Oilseed rape, a widely cultivated grain crop
 Overseas Service Ribbon, a US military award

See also
 OSR1, a gene
 OSR2 (gene)
 BDTH2 or OSR#1, an organosulfur compound used as a chelation agent
 OSRIC, or Old School Reference and Index Compilation, a Dungeons & Dragons retro-clone